Siah Makan-e Bozorg (also Romanized as Sīāh Makān-e Bozorg; also known as Līrāvī-ye Shomālī, Seyāh Makān ‘Olyā, Sīāh Makān, Sīāh Makan-e Bālā, Sīāh Makān-e Bālā Bozorg, Sīāh Makān-e ‘Olyā, Sīāh Makan ‘Olyā, Sīā Makān, and Sīā Makān-e Bozorg) is a village in Liravi-ye Shomali Rural District of the Central District of Deylam County, Bushehr province, Iran. At the 2006 census, its population was 824 in 154 households. The following census in 2011 counted 799 people in 180 households. The latest census in 2016 showed a population of 702 people in 179 households; it was the largest village in its rural district.

References 

Populated places in Deylam County